Seaquam Secondary  is a public high school serving the affluent Sunshine Hills and Sunshine Woods neighbourhoods in Delta, British Columbia. Seaquam has remained a top rated high school in British Columbia since its opening in 1977, many years ranking in the top 10 and top 20. The Fraser Institute listed Seaquam Secondary as the highest ranked public school in British Columbia in 2018, coming in 20th overall with independent schools taking the first 19 spots.

The school name was decided by a contest in which students and members of the community participated. The Board of School Trustees chose "Seaquam" in the end, which means or 'sunshine' in the Musqueam language.

The school opened on September 6, 1977, with 37 staff members and 633 students in grades 7 to 11. The number of staff was increased to 41 when one hundred more students enrolled than expected. Since then, grade 12 was added and grade 7 was dropped to meet the present 8-12 standard for high schools. A few of the original teaching staff still remain teaching in Seaquam.

Programs

Since 2011 Seaquam has been an IB (International Baccalaureate) World School.

On five occasions, the Seaquam Performing Arts Program has placed in the top six at the BC Festival of the Arts. Many Seaquam alumni have become well known professional performers.

The Seaquam Secondary Athletics program has won four BC provincial Championships, with the first coming in 2004 by the Junior Girls Volleyball team.  The Football program subsequently won BC Provincial Championships three years in a row from 2006 to 2008.  The Varsity Football Team won the BC AA High School Championship in 2006 and in 2017. This was followed by a BC AA Junior Varsity Championship in 2007, and a Grade 8 Tier II Championship in 2008.  In 2011 The Senior Girls Volleyball team captured the school's first ever Senior Girls BCSS Championship by winning the AAA Girls Volleyball Provincials in Parksvile.

Notable alumni
Adam Braidwood, former CFL player
Martin Cummins, actor
Cameron Melnyk, State of Shock singer
Deanna Milligan, actress
Jason Gray-Stanford, actor
Dave Randorf, TSN sports analyst
Dean Back, Theory of a Deadman bass player
Vinessa Antoine, actress

References

High schools in Delta, British Columbia
Educational institutions established in 1977
International Baccalaureate schools in British Columbia
1977 establishments in British Columbia